George F. McGinnis (born August 10, 1950) is an American former professional basketball player who played 11 seasons in the American Basketball Association (ABA) and National Basketball Association (NBA). He was drafted into the ABA from Indiana University in 1971.

Early life
McGinnis attended Washington High School in Indianapolis.  He and teammate Steve Downing led Washington  to a 31–0 record and a state championship in 1969. McGinnis set an Indiana state tournament scoring record with 148 points in his final four games. He was also named Mr. Basketball for the state of Indiana that year.

College career
In the 1970–71 season at Indiana, McGinnis became the first sophomore to lead the Big Ten in scoring and rebounding. He averaged 29.9 points per game in his lone season in Bloomington earning All-American and All-Big Ten Honors in 1971. He played for coach Lou Watson, the year before IU hired Bob Knight.

Professional career

Indiana Pacers (1971-1975) 
McGinnis immediately became one of the marquee players of the ABA, playing a key role on the Indiana Pacers' championship teams in each of his first two seasons with his hometown franchise. He was named the ABA Playoffs MVP in 1973, averaging 23.9 points and 12.3 rebounds in 18 playoffs games to help the Pacers repeat as champs. His best season came in 1974–75, when McGinnis scored a career-high 29.8 points per game en route to ABA MVP honors. He nearly averaged a triple-double in the playoffs that year (32.3 points, 15.9 rebounds, and 8.2 assists in 18 games), but the Pacers fell short of the title, losing to Kentucky in the ABA Finals.

Philadelphia 76ers (1975-1978) 
Two years into his professional career, McGinnis was selected by the Philadelphia 76ers as the 22nd overall pick in the second round of the 1973 NBA draft. In October 1974, the 76ers were ready to send McGinnis' draft rights to the New York Knicks with the stipulation that the latter ballclub signs him before the agreed-upon deadline. The deal fell through when he decided to stay with the Pacers and signed a two-year contract with an $85,000 buyout clause which was exercised following the 1974–75 season. Preferring to play in New York because of its financial endorsement opportunities, McGinnis sought a preliminary injunction and restraining order against the NBA on May 23, 1975, that would have permitted him to negotiate with any of the league's 18 teams. The lawsuit was dropped a week later on May 30 when he signed a six‐year $2.4 million contract with the Knicks in a challenge to the league's constitution. In his first action as new NBA commissioner on June 5, Larry O'Brien disapproved the contract and ordered the Knicks to forfeit its first selection in the 1976 NBA draft and reimburse the 76ers for all expenses relevant to the dispute. McGinnis signed a six‐year, $3.2 million guaranteed, no‐cut, no‐trade, no-option contract with the 76ers five weeks later on July 10, 1975.

McGinnis made the All-NBA First Team in his debut season with the 76ers, and was selected to two All-Star games in his three seasons with the team. While on Philadelphia, he teamed up with fellow ABA alumni Julius Erving and Caldwell Jones. McGinnis helped lead the 76ers through the playoffs to the NBA Finals in 1977 by averaging 14.2 points, 10.4 rebounds, and 3.6 assists per playoff game, where he and the 76ers lost in six games to the Portland Trail Blazers.

Denver Nuggets (1978-1980) 
McGinnis was traded to the Denver Nuggets in 1978 for Bobby Jones, and was an All-Star again that season. On January 9, 1980, McGinnis scored an NBA career-high 43 points (His career high in combined ABA/NBA is 58 points in the ABA), along with grabbing 12 rebounds, in a game against the Houston Rockets.

Return to Indiana (1980-1982) 
Hoping to boost sagging attendance in their early NBA years, the Pacers re-acquired McGinnis by trading away young forward Alex English. However, McGinnis was beyond his prime, averaging a comparatively low 13.1 points per game during the 1980-81 NBA season, and was unable to help the Pacers past their first round matchup against the 76ers in the 1981 NBA Playoffs, while English went on to be a multiple time all-star and franchise player for the Nuggets.

McGinnis is one of four players (the others are Roger Brown, Reggie Miller, and Mel Daniels) to have his jersey (#30) retired by the Pacers. All four are also members of the Basketball Hall of Fame.

Basketball Hall of Fame
On April 1, 2017, it was announced that McGinnis was part of the 2017 class for the Naismith Memorial Basketball Hall of Fame, alongside Tracy McGrady, Bill Self, and Rebecca Lobo. He was inducted on September 8.

ABA and NBA achievements
Member of the 1972 and 1973 Indiana Pacers ABA championship teams.
Second Team All-ABA selection in 1973.
Two All-ABA First Team selections (1974–1975).
Three ABA All-Star selections (1973–1975).
Selected as ABA Co-MVP, with Julius Erving, in 1975.
Won the ABA scoring title in 1975.
Recorded 13 known triple-doubles in the ABA, more than anyone else during the league's lifespan.
First Team All-NBA selection in 1976.
Second Team All-NBA selection in 1977.
Three NBA All-Star selections (1976, 1977, and 1979).
Member of the ABA's All-Time Team.
Number retired by Indiana Pacers.
Inducted Naismith Basketball Hall of Fame September 2017

See also
 Basketball in the United States

References

External links

1950 births
Living people
African-American basketball players
All-American college men's basketball players
American men's basketball players
Basketball players from Indianapolis
Centers (basketball)
Denver Nuggets players
Indiana Hoosiers men's basketball players
Indiana Pacers players
Naismith Memorial Basketball Hall of Fame inductees
National Basketball Association All-Stars
National Basketball Association players with retired numbers
Parade High School All-Americans (boys' basketball)
Philadelphia 76ers draft picks
Philadelphia 76ers players
Power forwards (basketball)
21st-century African-American people
20th-century African-American sportspeople